Ælfhelm was a medieval Bishop of Dorchester, when the town was seat of the united dioceses of Lindsey and Dorchester.

Ælfhelm was consecrated in 1002 and died between 1007 and 1009.

Notes

References

External links
 

Bishops of Dorchester (Mercia)